Anambas Islands Regency is a small archipelago of Indonesia, located  northeast of Batam Island in the North Natuna Sea between the Malaysian mainland to the west and the island of Borneo to the east. Geographically part of the Tudjuh Archipelago, it is administratively a regency within the Riau Islands Province. The administrative centre is at Tarempa on Siantan Island.

Islands

Main islands 
The principal islands are Siantan (on which is situated the main town of Tarempa), Matak, Mubur, Jemaja and Kiabu (Air Bini).

Matak island 
The Anambas archipelago contains a large reserve of natural gas that is exported to countries such as Singapore and Malaysia. The island of Matak is the main base for oil exploration.

Pulau Bawah 
Pulau Bawah, formerly known as Leeward island, is a clustered archipelago of six islands with an exclusive resort accessed by the seaplane. It is located about 150 nautical miles northeast of Singapore and Batam, is a cluster of islets that collectively surround three lagoons, each of which suitable for snorkelling, scubadiving and coral beach activities. CNN rates the Anambas Islands are one of Southeast Asia's most spectacular coastal spots, with good snorkelling and diving spots, and Pulau Bawah in particular has good tourism potential.

Whilst the majority of the population generates their income from fishing and fishing-related industries, tourism has been gaining traction. Hostel and hotel rooms are available in Jemaja and Tarempa, along with some homestay locations.

Diving 
The shipwrecked vessels Seven Skies and Igara attract a variety of indigenous marine life and offer diving opportunities.

Administrative districts
At the 2010 Census, the Regency was divided into seven districts (kecamatan), but three additional districts have subsequently been created by splitting of two of the existing districts - Jemaja Barat from Jemaja District, and Siantan Utara and Kute Siantan from Palmatak District. The ten districts are tabulated below with their areas and their populations at the 2010 Census and the 2020 Census. The table also includes the location of the district administrative centres, the number of villages (rural desa and urban kelurahan) in each district, and its post code.

Notes: (a) the area and 2010 population of the new Jemaja Barat District are included in the figures for Jemaja District, from which it was cut out. (b) notwithstanding the district name, this is situated on Matak Island, of which it comprises the southern part. (c) comprises most of Matak Island, plus nearly small islands. (d) notwithstanding the district name, this is situated on Mubur Island. (e) the areas and 2010 populations of the new Siantan Utara District and Kute Siantan District are included in the figures for Palmatak District, from which they were cut out.

See also

 Badas Islands
 Natuna Islands
 Tambelan archipelago

References

External links

 National Geospatial-intelligence Agency (2005) "Borneo: Northwest Coast and Kepulauan Tudjuh" Sailing directions (enroute): Borneo, Jawa, Sulawesi, and Nusa Tenggara United States National Geospatial-Intelligence Agency
 
 Website all things about Anambas "Virtual Journey to Anambas"
 Pulau Bawah website
 Pulau Bawah (formerly Leeward Islands) map
 Islas ANAMBAS (Spanish)

Regencies of the Riau Islands
Tudjuh Archipelago
 
Populated places in Indonesia